In early 2021, there were just under 9,800 unique Conservation Areas in England (excluding sub-sections managed by secondary Local Planning Authorities), providing heritage protection for around 2.3% of England's land area and over 10% of properties. This article was originally intended to provide a comprehensive list, arranged by ceremonial county and district / unitary authority, but the listing has remained incomplete (currently around 10% including external links) and has only been sporadically added to or maintained. The table has been retained at the foot of this article, as it provides a holding structure for a number of useful local links, but its usefulness has been largely superseded by other sources. 

In mid-2017, the first attempt at a comprehensive listing was published, accompanied by a range of supporting analysis, and made available as a PDF download or in spreadsheet format from the author. This has subsequently been improved on by a new national spatial dataset, containing not only the names and key attributes of all English conservation areas, but a full boundary dataset suitable for use in spatial analysis. This is currently the best available summary of English conservation areas, but will gradually become outdated as Local Planning Authorities designate new areas or amend the spatial extent of existing areas. 

There is marked variation in the use of conservation area status across England, with coverage ranging from 100% of properties in the Isles of Scilly (which is one large conservation area) through an average of 17% in London (although some boroughs have over 50% coverage) to under 5% in about 30% of local authority areas. In some areas, the listing of individual buildings plays a very prominent role in local heritage protection, but in London almost 40 times as many properties benefit from conservation area protections, and in some areas such as Blackpool, Watford, Oadby and Wigston and Eastbourne the ratio is over 50.

An official national spatial dataset for English conservation areas is maintained by Historic England, who make copies available on request, although 4% of Local Planning Authorities are omitted and a further 20% have not currently granted permission to publish their data.

Conservation areas

References 
Notes

Sources

 Bedford Conservation Areas – Accessed 24 October 2013
 Luton Conservation Areas – Accessed 24 October 2013
 Mid Bedfordshire Local Plan Appendix 2 List of Conservation Areas – Accessed 21/06/2007
 South Bedfordshire Local Plan – Accessed 21/06/2007
 Bracknell Forest Conservation Areas – Accessed 24 October 2013
 Conservation Areas in Reading – Accessed 24 October 2013
 Conservation Area consent in Slough – Accessed 24 October 2013
 Windsor & Maidenhead Conservation Areas – Accessed 24 October 2013
 Bristol Conservation Areas – Accessed 24 October 2013
 Aylesbury Vale Conservation Areas – Accessed 24 October 2013
 Bradford Conservation Areas – Accessed 24 October 2013
 Yorkshire Dales National Park Conservation Areas – Accessed 24 October 2013

Conservation areas
Conservation areas in England